Abramovo is a rural locality (a village) in Lozovskoye Rural Settlement of Sergiyevo-Posadsky District, Moscow Oblast, Russia. The population was 736 as of 2010. There are 4 streets.

Geography 
Abramovo is located 10 km southeast of Sergiyev Posad (the district's administrative centre) by road. Ilyinki is the nearest rural locality.

References 

Rural localities in Moscow Oblast